Vasilije Popović may refer to:

 Vasilije Popović (cleric) (1860–1938), Serbian Orthodox Metropolitan
 Vasilije Popović (revolutionary) (1775–1832), Serbian revolutionary
 Vasilije Popović, real name of Pavle Ugrinov (1926–2007), Serbian writer, playwright, director and academic
 , author of the National emblem of North Macedonia
 Vasilije Popović (production designer), winner of a Golden Arena for Best Production Design